Mach 9 or variation, may refer to:

 Mach number for nine times the speed of sound
 Hypersonic speed of 9 times the speed of sound
 Wharfedale MACH 9, a loudspeaker 
 Mach-IX (Marvel Comics), comic book superhero alter-ego of Marvel Comics character Abner Jenkins
 "Mach 9 (nine) is equivalent to 6905.42 miles per hour - Source Google Unit Convertor

See also

Mach (disambiguation)